{{Infobox musical composition
| name                = Of the Father's heart begotten
| image               = Divinum mysterium.jpg 
| alt                 = 
| caption             = The original plainsong of "Divinum mysterium" in Piae Cantiones
| translation         = 
| native_name         = Corde natus
| native_name_lang    = 
| composer            = 
| genre               = Christmas carol
| occasion            = 
| text                = Aurelius Prudentius, translated by John Mason Neale, Henry W. Baker, Roby Furley Davis
| written             = 
| based_on            =  
| meter               = 8.7.8.7.8.7.7
| melody              = "Divinum mysterium"
| composed            = 
| published           = 1582
| misc                =  
}}

"Of the Father's heart begotten" alternatively known as "Of the Father's love begotten" is a doctrinal hymn based on the Latin poem "Corde natus" by the Roman poet Aurelius Prudentius, from his Liber Cathemerinon (hymn no. IX) beginning "Da puer plectrum" which includes the Latin stanzas listed below.

History
The ancient poem was translated and paired with a medieval plainchant melody "Divinum mysterium". "Divinum mysterium" was a "Sanctus trope" – an ancient plainchant melody which over the years had been musically embellished. An early version of this chant appears in manuscript form as early as the 10th century, although without the melodic additions, and "trope" versions with various melodic differences appear in Italian, German, Gallacian, Bohemian and Spanish manuscripts dating from the 13th to 16th centuries.

"Divinum mysterium" first appears in print in 1582 in the Finnish song book Piae Cantiones, a collection of seventy-four sacred and secular church and school songs of medieval Europe compiled by Jaakko Suomalainen and published by Theodoric Petri. In this collection, "Divinum mysterium" was classified as "De Eucharistia", reflecting its original use for the Mass.

The text of the "Divinum mysterium" was replaced by the words of Prudentius's poem when it was published by Thomas Helmore in 1851. In making this fusion, the original metre of the chant was disturbed, changing the original triple metre rhythm into a duple metre and therefore altering stresses and note lengths. A later version by Charles Winfred Douglas (1867–1944) corrected this using an "equalist" method of transcription, although the hymn is now found in both versions as well as a more dance-like interpretation of the original melody.

Translations
There are two translations commonly sung today; one by John Mason Neale and Henry W. Baker, and another by Roby Furley Davis.
 
Neale's original translation began "Of the Father sole begotten" in his Hymnal Noted (London, 1851), and contained only six stanzas (of the original Latin poem's thirty-eight). It was Neale's music editor, Thomas Helmore, who paired this hymn with the Latin plainsong. Neale's translation was later edited and extended to nine stanzas by Henry W. Baker for Hymns Ancient and Modern (London, 1861; below).

Dissatisfied with Neale's translation, Roby Furley Davis (1866–1937), a scholar at St John's College, Cambridge, wrote a new version for The English Hymnal of 1906. Davis was assistant master at Weymouth College and a scholar of the works of Tacitus, especially his book on Agricola. This version was also used in the popular Carols for Choirs'' series by David Willcocks.

Text and translations

See also
 List of Christmas carols

References

External links
 
"Of the Father's heart begotten" (Corde natus ex Parentis) (Douglas Brooks-Davies), Choral Public Domain Library
 Of The Father's Heart Begotten (arr. David Willcocks) sung by the Ely Cathedral Choir

Christmas carols
Latin-language Christian hymns
Piae Cantiones
Advent songs